Sir Christopher John White CVO FBA (born 19 September 1930) is a British art historian and curator.  He is the son of the artist and art administrator Gabriel White.  He has specialized in the study of Rembrandt and Dutch Golden Age painting and printmaking.

White received a BA from the University of London, followed by an MA from the University of Oxford, and a PhD at the Courtauld Institute, University of London.  He then joined the British Museum's Department of Prints and Drawings in 1954.  From 1965 to 1971 he was Director of Old Master Sales at Colnaghi in London, then moving to be curator of graphic arts for the National Gallery of Art in Washington, D.C., until 1973.  

From 1973, White was Director of the Paul Mellon Centre for Studies in British Art, an affiliate of Yale in London, and also an associate director of the Yale Center for British Art.  In 1985 he left these to become Director of the Ashmolean Museum in Oxford and a Fellow of Worcester College, Oxford, retiring in 1997. 

In 1997, White became a Trustee of the Victoria and Albert Museum. He is also Vice-Chairman of the British Institute of Florence and a Trustee of the Mauritshuis in The Hague.  He was knighted in the 2001 New Year Honours for services to art history.

Selected works
His books include:
 Rembrandt as an Etcher: A Study of the Artist at Work, 1969
Christopher White, The Late Etchings of Rembrandt, 1969, British Museum/Lund Humphries, London (exhibition catalogue)
 Rembrandt, World of Art series, Thames & Hudson
 White, Christopher, Buvelot, Quentin (eds), Rembrandt by himself, 1999, National Gallery, London/Mauritshuis, The Hague, 
 Anthony Van Dyck: Thomas Howard, Earl of Arundel (Getty Museum Studies on Art), 2006
 The Later Flemish Pictures in the Collection of Her Majesty The Queen, 2007, with Desmond Shawe-Taylor
 Dutch Pictures in the Collection of Her Majesty the Queen, 2016
 Anthony Van Dyck and the Art of Portraiture, 2021

References

Bibliography
 "Dictionary": Dictionary of Art Historians
 ‘WHITE, Prof. Sir Christopher (John)’, Who's Who 2013, A & C Black, an imprint of Bloomsbury Publishing plc, 2013; online edition, Oxford University Press, 2012.

1930 births
Living people
Alumni of the Courtauld Institute of Art
British art historians
British art curators
English curators
Rembrandt scholars
Fellows of the British Academy
Fellows of Worcester College, Oxford
Employees of the British Museum
People associated with the Ashmolean Museum
Directors of museums in the United Kingdom
National Gallery of Art
People associated with the Victoria and Albert Museum
Commanders of the Royal Victorian Order
Knights Bachelor